Wenge Musica (also known as Wenge Musica BCBG) were a Congolese soukous band. It was formed by Didier Masela in July 1981 and directed by JB Mpiana from 1986 to the breakup of the group in 1997. The band is considered one of the most dominant on the Congolese scene.

History

Early years 
In 1979, The group was seen as a hobby. It was named Celio Stars at first, made up of Aimé Buanga, Werrason, Didier Masela, Machiro Kifaya, Papy Sanji on vocals and Kija Brown as a regular member. They focused on the group on vacation. At the end of the holidays, they concentrated on their studies. Instruments were introduced to the band when Didier Masela learned to play bass at a boarding school in Mbanza-Boma. Werrason and Aimé Buanga also learned to play bass. 

On 16 July 1981, Celio Stars was renamed Wenge Musica by Jean-Belis Luvutula, who was close to the band. It is considered by various sources that the group was recreated on that date, although Luvutula stated that it was in 1979.

Wenge Musica's first line-up consisted of: Aimé Buanga, Didier Masela on guitars, Werrason, Machiro Kifaya and Papy Sanji on vocals. The administration was composed of Papy Kimbi and Kija Brown. They were later joined by Dede Masolo, Wes Koka, Anicet Pandu on vocals, Alain Mwanga, Alain Makaba and Christian Zitu on guitars and Ladins Montana, Maradona and Evo Nsiona on drums.

In late 1982, JB Mpiana, who was residing in Gombe at the time, joins the band during a rehearsal. His voice was admired by the Wenge members, who asked him to join. Mpiana brought in a new singer, Blaise Bula, with whom he was studying at the Athénée de Kalina.

First performances 
The band Wenge Musica gave their first concerts at the Moto Na Moto and Olympia bars around 1984. At this time, the group already has several songs composed by Werrason, Aimé Buanga, Alain Mwanga and Aimé Buanga. 

An unreleased album was recorded at Studio Veve in 1986. It contained the songs "Kin É Bougé", "Bébé", "Laura", "Sylvie" and "Césarine".

They played as opening act in concerts of famous groups, including Langa Langa Stars and Choc Stars.

Line-up changes 
Several members left the group that year, Anibo Pandu, Wes Koka, Christian Zitu and Dede Masolo, the latter of whom converted to Christianity and became a pastor. Aimé Buanga and Alain Mwanga "Docteur Zing" traveled to Europe for academic reasons.

Buanga had the idea of having two teams: 1 in Kinshasa and the other in Europe, forming Wenge Musica Aile Paris. The musicians in Kinshasa took it as a split.

The lineup now consisted of: JB Mpiana, Werrason, Blaise Bula, Adolphe Dominguez, Ricoco Bulambemba and Alain Mpela on vocals, Alain Makaba, Djolina, Blaise Kombo and Didier Masela on guitars, Maradona and Evo Nsiona on drums. The group had their first atalaku, Full King.

Apogee 
The first official album of the group "Bouger Bouger Makinzu", recorded in 1987, was released the next year. The recording sessions took place in the Bobongo studio, where Makaba had recording sessions with members of Zaiko Langa Langa. The album was produced by the Bisel label. The cover photo was also taken in 1987, after the group's first televised performance at the Veve Center.

The album was reissued in 1994 by English label Natari with two additional tracks.

The album includes the band's first hit "Mulolo", composed by JB Mpiana. The song has been rehearsed since 1986. The chorus of the song originates from a traditional Bandundu song, contributed by Nico Bwakongo, Werrason's uncle.

Wenge Musica appeared in the BBC documentary, Under African Skies, released in 1989.

Later years 

The band makes their first tour in Europe in 1991. During the tour, they record their second album "Kin É Bougé" with 5 songs.

The eponymous hit song was composed in 1986 by JB Mpiana. The lyrics were changed with Marie-Paul Kambulu in 1990 when the band's administrators, Mpiana, Werrason, Makaba and Masela were arrested for possessing false visas.

After the recording of the album, vocalist Marie-Paul leaves the band to enter Wenge Musica Aile Paris, with Aimé Buanga, Docteur Zing and Ricoco. A rivalry between the two groups will start.

The group is at its peak. They eventually gave concerts with Zaiko Langa Langa and Kassav' in 1993, after recording the album "Kala-Yi-Boeing" including the hits "Danico", "Voyage Mboso" and "Kala-Yi-Boeing".

The new members of Wenge Musica in 1993: Aimelia Biakondile on vocals, Tutu Callugi as atalaku and Burkina Faso as soloist.

In the late 1990s, the group pioneered the "ndombolo" dance that was all the rage in Africa. The atalaku Tutu Callugi focuses on dance on JB Mpiana's solo album "Feux De L'Amour" released in May 1997.

This album causes the division of the band into two factions: Wenge BCBG, led by JB Mpiana and Wenge Musica Maison Mère, led by Werrason.

After-split, feud between Mpiana and Werrason 
For years after the split of Wenge Musica, the two headliners of the latter's dissidents, the conflict between Werrason and JB Mpiana became more serious. Echoes from Kinshasa then affirmed that several families separated due to certain members choosing sides. 

The album titles of each side the year following the separation had a connection with the event. Wenge BCBG released Titanic (symbolizing the fall of the great ship Wenge), while Wenge Maison Mère released Force d’Intervention Rapide (claiming that this faction of the group will rescue those who fell from the ship during its fall).

Several video cassettes showing the two groups in conflict were well sold in several record stores.

Reconciliation attempt 
An attempt at reconciliation between Mpiana and Werrason took place in June 2003, in front of the ex-president Joseph Kabila. Despite this, the two camps were still throwing spades in their albums.

Reunions

2010 reunion 
At the end of 2010, thanks to a sponsor, the telephone provider Airtel, a private party saw for the first time in 13 years, the reunion of the band for a single concert. On stage were present Werrason (briefly before leaving for another concert), Blaise Bula, Alain Makaba, Adolphe Dominguez, Alain Mpela, Aimelia Lias, Didier Masela and Titina Al Capone accompanied by a few session musicians. JB Mpiana did not take part in this event, he was then traveling to Paris for professional reasons.

2022 reunion 
On February 28, 2022, at the initiative of Congolese producer Amadou Diaby, the ex-administrators of Wenge Musica reconcile and sign a contract for the recording of an EP in Cape Verde, a series of concerts in Kinshasa, including the first will take place on June 30, 2022 as well as a documentary on the history of the group.

Band members 

 Werrason – vocals (1981–1997)
 Dede Masolo – vocals (1981–1986)
 Anibo Pandu – vocals (1981–1986)
 Wes Koka – vocals (1981–1985)
 Machiro Kifaya – vocals (1981–1984)
 JB Mpiana – vocals (1983–1997)
 Blaise Bula – vocals (1984–1997)
 Adolphe Dominguez – vocals (1985–1997)
 Ricoco Bulambemba – vocals (1986–1991)
 Alain Mpela – vocals (1986–1997)
 Full King – atalaku (rapper) (1986–1993)
 Marie-Paul Kambulu – vocals (1987–1991)
 Manda Chante – vocals (1989–1993)
 Roberto Ekokota – atalaku (rapper) (1988–1997)
 Kennedy Mbala – atalaku (rapper) (1988–1989)
 Aimelia Lias – vocals (1993–1997)
 Tutu Callugi – atalaku (rapper) (1993–1997)
 Ferre Gola – vocals (1995–1997)
 Michael Tshendu – vocals (1996–1997)
 Alain Makaba – guitar, bass, synthesizer (1981–1997)
 Docteur Zing – guitar (1981–1986)
 Aimé Buanga – bass (1981–1986)
 Didier Masela – bass (1981–1997)
 Christian Zitu – guitar (1981-1985)
 Ladins Montana – drums (1981–1982)
 Maradona Lontomba – drums (1981–1990)
 Evo Nsiona – congas (1981–1988)
 Djolina Mandudila – guitar (1984–1993)
 Aridjana – guitar (1984–1990)
 Eddy Kandimbo – guitar (1986–1989)
 Blaise Kombo – guitar (1986–1990, died 1990)
 Pipo La Musica – drums (1987–1989)
 Alain Mwepu – guitar (1988–1993)
 Delo Vundu – bass (1988–1991)
 Patient Kusangila – guitar (1989–1997)
 Collégien Zola – guitar (1988–1992)
 Titina Al Capone – drums (1989–1997)
 Don Pierrot Mbonda – congas (1988–1993)
 Christian Mabanga – bass (1990–1997)
 Fi-Carré Mwamba – guitar (1990–1997)
 Désiré Kalala – synthesizer (1991–1993)
 Burkina Faso Mboka Liya – guitar (1993–1997)
 Ali Mbonda – drums (1993–1997)
 Japonais Maladi – guitar (1995–1997)
 Théo Bidens – synthesizer (1995–1997)
 Seguin Mignon – drums (1995–1997)

Discography 

 Bouger Bouger (1988)
 Kin É Bougé (1991)
 Kala-Yi-Boeing (1993)
 Les Anges Adorables (volume 1 and 2) (1994)
 Pleins Feux (recorded in 1992) (1996)
 Pentagone (1996)

References 

Musical groups established in 1981